Baldeador is one of the 48 administrative districts in which the city of Niterói, Rio de Janeiro in Brazil is divided. It lies in the northern zone of the city, bordering the municipality of São Gonçalo. Its name derives from the Portuguese word for railway junction.

Neighbourhoods of Niterói
Beaches of Brazil